Gerry Jones may refer to:
Gerry Jones (politician) (1932–2017), Australian politician
Gerry Jones (footballer) (1945–2021), English footballer
Gerry Jones (ice hockey) (born 1937), American ice hockey player

See also
Jerry Jones (disambiguation)